The Bronx County Courthouse, also known as the Mario Merola Building, is an historic courthouse building located in the Concourse and Melrose neighborhoods of the Bronx in New York City. It was designed in 1931 and built between 1931 and 1934.  It is a nine-story limestone building on a rusticated granite base in the Art Deco style.  It has four identical sides, an interior court, and a frieze designed by noted sculptor Charles Keck.  The sculptures on the 161st Street side are by noted sculptor George Holburn Snowden. Two sculptural groups on the Walton Avenue side are by noted sculptor Joseph Kiselewski.  The Bronx Museum of the Arts was once located on the main floor. The building stands two blocks east-southeast of Yankee Stadium, and across 161st Street from Joyce Kilmer Park.

While never officially titled 'Borough Hall', the Bronx County Courthouse houses all municipal borough functions, and is listed as a borough hall on maps by the Metropolitan Transportation Authority. The previous freestanding Bronx Borough Hall was damaged by fire and torn down in 1969, but had stopped operating in an official capacity long before this.

Murals 
The first floor's Veterans Memorial Hall houses four 10 ft. by 36 ft. murals, one per wall, by James Monroe Hewlett, depicting historic events in the Bronx. The murals were unveiled in June 1934 and feature the following historical events:
 The Arrival of Jonas Bronck – 1639, in what is now Mott Haven.
 The First Meeting of the Westchester County Court – 1764, in what is now Westchester Square.
 The Battle of Pell's Point – October 18, 1776, in what is now Pelham Bay Park.
 The Departure of George Washington from the Van Cortlandt House – November 1783 in what is now Van Cortlandt Park.

A mural  depicting the arrival of Jonas Bronck,  considered the founder of the borough, was created in the early 1930s by James Monroe Hewlett. The mural was damaged by workers in August 2013. Many people, including the proprietor of Jonas Bronck's Beer Co and a reported descendant of Laurens Duyts, a Danish farmer who traveled to New Amsterdam with Bronck on his ship Fire of Troy, sought the mural's restoration prior to the 100th anniversary of the Bronx's separation from New York County in 2014.

It was listed on the National Register of Historic Places in 1983.

Renaming
In February 1988, Mayor Edward Koch renamed the Bronx County Courthouse to the Mario Merola Building to honor the late Bronx County District Attorney Mario Merola.

See also 
 Bronx Borough Hall
 Bronx Borough Courthouse
 Bronx court system delays
 List of New York City borough halls and municipal buildings
 National Register of Historic Places listings in Bronx County, New York
 List of New York City Designated Landmarks in The Bronx

References
 

Government buildings in the Bronx
County courthouses in New York (state)
Courthouses on the National Register of Historic Places in New York City
Government buildings completed in 1934
1930s architecture in the United States
New York City Designated Landmarks in the Bronx
Neoclassical architecture in New York City
National Register of Historic Places in the Bronx
Concourse, Bronx
Art Deco architecture in the Bronx
1934 establishments in New York City